Scantling is a surname. Notable people with the surname include:

Garrett Scantling (born 1993), American decathlete
Marquez Valdes-Scantling (born 1994), American football player

See also
Scantlin, surname